Alena Kupčíková (born 22 October 1976) is a Czech artist.

She also includes hair from both human and animal sources in her drawings. Her multimedia works also incorporate recordings of various sounds.

Kupčíková is dyslexic and founded a non-profit organization in support of dyslexic children. She created a special multimedia work for dyslexic children which received an award at the 2014 International Exhibition of Inventions (IEIK) in Kunshan.

In 2003, she was awarded a LVMH prize for her work. Kupčíková is a member of the FEMLINK international women's art group which was founded in Paris in 2006.

Her work is included in the collection of the National Gallery in Prague and in private collections in the Czech Republic, Slovakia, Germany, Poland, the Netherlands, England, Switzerland, Japan and the United States.

References 

1976 births
Living people
Czech women painters
Czech women sculptors
Conceptual artists
People from Šumperk
21st-century Czech women artists
People with dyslexia